Rhythm of the Night may refer to 

 Rhythm of the Night (album), 1985 album by DeBarge 
 "Rhythm of the Night" (song), song by DeBarge from the album of the same name
 "The Rhythm of the Night", a 1993 song performed by Corona
 The Rhythm of the Night (album), an album by Corona
 "The Rhythm of the Night", a 2008 song by Hermes House Band